Dongfeng is a town in and the seat of Dongfeng County in eastern Jilin province, China, located along China National Highway 303 about  from Liaoyuan. , it has nine residential communities and 21 villages under its administration.

See also 
 List of township-level divisions of Jilin

References 

Township-level divisions of Jilin
Dongfeng County